Stenoma emphanes is a moth in the family Depressariidae. It was described by Edward Meyrick in 1917. It is found in Burma.

The wingspan is about 20 mm. The forewings are whitish ochreous and the hindwings are light grey.

References

Moths described in 1917
Stenoma